The Six Days of Milan was a six-day track cycling race held in Milan, Italy from 1927 until 2008.

Winners

References

Cycle races in Italy
Sports competitions in Milan
Six-day races
Recurring sporting events established in 1927
1927 establishments in Italy